Atamjit Singh is a Sahitya Akademi Award winning Punjabi playwright. He returned his Sahitya Akademi Award in October 2015. Singh is a part of the Dakshinayan Abhiyan.

Books and plays

 Kabrastaan: A full length play  
 Chabian: A collection of 5 short plays 
 Hawa Mahal: A collection of 5 short plays 
 Natak Natak Natak: A collection of 4short plays 
 Rishtian Daa Kee Rakhiye Naa: A full length play 
 Shahar Beemar Hai: A full length play 
 Farsh Vich Uggia Rukh: A full length play 
 Chirian: A collection of 3 short plays 
 Puran: A full length play 
 Kamloops Diaan Machhian: A full length play 
 Mein Taan Ikk Saarangi Haan: A full length play  
 Panch Nad Da Pani: A full length play 
 Tatti Tawi Da Sach: A full length Punjabi play 
 Mungu Comrade: A full length play 
 Murh Aa Lama ToN: A full length play 
 Ghadar Express: A full length play  
 Tasveer Da Teeja Paasa: A full length play 
 Eh Mahabharat da Yug Nahi: A full length play 
 Guachi Nadi Da Geet: A full length play 
 Balde Rahan Chiragh Hamesha: A full length play

Awards

Singh won the Sahitya Akademi Award in 2009 for Tatti Tavi Da Sach (Play) and the Sangeet Natak Akademi Award in 2011.

References 

21st-century Indian dramatists and playwrights
Punjabi-language writers
Recipients of the Sahitya Akademi Award in Punjabi
Dramatists and playwrights from Punjab, India
Recipients of the Sangeet Natak Akademi Award